Ji Hongchang (1895–1934), born Ji Hengli, was a Chinese general and patriot.

Hongchang was born in Fugou, Henan province. He started his military career in 1913 under General Feng Yuxiang. He was the commander of the 22nd Army when he was appointed as Ningxia chairman. Refusing to attack the Red Army led by the Communist Party while the whole country was threatened by Japan, he was sacked by Chiang Kai-shek and ordered to "observe and study" abroad. He returned to China in 1932. In May 1933, he helped to organize the Chahar People's Anti-Japanese Army together with Feng Yuxiang and Fang Zhenwu and directed it along the front line against the Japanese invaders. The army recovered the Japanese-controlled Duolun (now in Inner Mongolia) and built nationwide confidence to fight against the Japanese. In October, the People's Army was extinguished, by Chiang Kai-shek who mobilized sixteen divisions against them.  Ji Hongchang fought on for a while before seeking asylum in Tianjin foreign concessions in January 1934.

Chiang's policy to "extinguish the outlaws (the Communists) before fighting against invaders" disappointed him.  As a result, he joined the Communist Party in March 1934. On April 24, Ji established the "Great Anti-Fascism Alliance of Chinese People" in Tianjin, with Feng Yuxiang, and Fang Zhenwu. Kuomintang agents injured Ji Hongchang in an assassination attempt on Nov 9th, and colluded with French police in extraditing Ji Hongchang for execution in Peking on Nov 24th.

Before his death, Ji reportedly asked his executioner for a chair, citing that he was a patriot fighting Japanese invaders and therefore should neither be kneeling nor falling when he dies, as well as demanding to be shot from the front, as he wanted to "see how the enemy's bullet kills me".

Film 
A Chinese film based on his life, 吉鸿昌 (Ji Hongchang), was released in China in 1979. It was a box office blockbuster, selling  tickets in China.

Reference

External links
Rulers: Ji Hongchang biography with photo
Quelling Internal Enemies Before Resisting Foreign Invaders

1895 births
1934 deaths
National Revolutionary Army generals from Henan
Politicians from Zhoukou
People of the Northern Expedition
People of the Central Plains War
Chinese police officers
People executed by the Republic of China by firearm
Executed Republic of China people
Executed Chinese people
Chinese Communist Party politicians from Henan
Republic of China politicians from Henan
20th-century executions by China
Executed people from Henan